Julian Redelinghuys (born 11 September 1989) is a South African rugby union footballer. His regular playing position is prop.

Career
In 2009, he joined the  academy, where he got selected for the South Africa Under-20 team for the 2009 IRB Junior World Championship.

He played in both legs of the ' promotion/relegation matches after the 2013 Super Rugby season, which saw the  regain their spot in Super Rugby.

References

1989 births
Alumni of Monument High School
Living people
South African rugby union players
South Africa international rugby union players
Sharks (Currie Cup) players
Golden Lions players
Lions (United Rugby Championship) players
Rugby union props
Rugby union players from Pretoria
Afrikaner people
South Africa Under-20 international rugby union players